Caladenia drakeoides, commonly known as the hinged dragon orchid is a species of orchid endemic to the south-west of Western Australia. It has a single hairy leaf and a single greenish-yellow and red flower with a hinged labellum resembling a female thynnid wasp.

Description 
Caladenia drakeoides is a terrestrial, perennial, deciduous, herb with an underground tuber and which grows as solitary plants or in clumps of up to ten plants.

The lateral sepals and petals are linear to lance-shaped, hang vertically and clasp the ovary. The labellum is greenish-yellow and red and covered with dark maroon hairs and calli. The false abdomen is strongly turned in towards the ovary. Flowering occurs from August to early October.

Taxonomy and naming
Caladenia drakeoides was first formally described by Stephen Hopper and Andrew Brown in 2001 from a specimen collected by Hopper near Dalwallinu. The description was published in Nuytsia. The specific epithet (drakeoides) refers to the similarity of the flowers of this species to those in the genus Drakaea - the suffix -oides means "likeness" in Latin.

Distribution and habitat
The hinged dragon orchid grows among shrubs near salt lakes and in winter-wet areas between Bonnie Rock and Lake Moore in the Avon Wheatbelt and Geraldton Sandplains biogeographic regions.

Ecology
As with orchids in the genus Drakaea, this species is pollinated by male thynnid wasps when they attempt to copulate with the flower.

Conservation
Caladenia drakeoides  is classified as "Threatened Flora (Declared Rare Flora — Extant)" by the Western Australian Government Department of Parks and Wildlife  and it has also been listed as "Endangered" (EN) under the Australian Government Environment Protection and Biodiversity Conservation Act 1999 (EPBC Act). The main threats to the species include weed invasion and grazing by goats (Capra hircus) and sheep (Ovis aries).

References

drakeoides
Orchids of Western Australia
Endemic orchids of Australia
Plants described in 2001
Endemic flora of Western Australia
Taxa named by Stephen Hopper
Taxa named by Andrew Phillip Brown